South Roscoe Township is a township in Hodgeman County, Kansas, United States.  As of the 2000 census, its population was 76.

Geography
According to the USGS, it contains one cemetery, Saint Michaels.

The stream of South Fork Buckner Creek runs through this township.

References
 USGS Geographic Names Information System (GNIS)

External links
 City-Data.com

Townships in Hodgeman County, Kansas
Townships in Kansas